Winford Gladstone Boynes III (born May 17, 1957) is a retired American professional basketball player. Born in Greenville, South Carolina, he was a 6'6" (198 cm) 185 lb (84 kg) guard and played collegiately at the University of San Francisco from 1975–1978.

Boynes was the 13th selection in the 1978 NBA Draft by the New Jersey Nets. The Nets had acquired the pick from the New York Knicks, along with Phil Jackson on June 8, 1978, in exchange for the Houston Rockets' 1978 first-round draft choice (Micheal Ray Richardson) and the Nets' 1979 first-round draft choice (Vinnie Johnson). In two seasons from 1978 to 1980, he played 133 games for the Nets, averaging 9.0 points, 2.2 rebounds and 1.3 assists per game. In 1980, Boynes was made available in the NBA expansion draft in which he was selected by the Dallas Mavericks. He was part of the starting lineup for the Mavs' first NBA game in 1980, in which he top-scored with 21 points in a 103–92 victory over the San Antonio Spurs.

He played for Fenerbahçe from Turkey in 1983–84 season in Turkish Basketball League.

References

External links
NBA stats @ basketballreference.com
Photo of Winford Boynes playing for the Dallas Mavericks @ mavswiki.com
Finnish League profile

1957 births
Living people
African-American basketball players
All-American college men's basketball players
American expatriate basketball people in Finland
American expatriate basketball people in France
American expatriate basketball people in Turkey
American men's basketball players
Basketball players from South Carolina
Dallas Mavericks expansion draft picks
Dallas Mavericks players
Esporte Clube Sírio basketball players
Fenerbahçe men's basketball players
New Jersey Nets draft picks
New Jersey Nets players
Parade High School All-Americans (boys' basketball)
San Francisco Dons men's basketball players
Shooting guards
Sportspeople from Greenville, South Carolina
21st-century African-American people
20th-century African-American sportspeople